Joseph Zupicich (October 1893 – April 11, 1987) was a crewmember on the  when  survivors boarded the liner after being rescued on April 15, 1912 from lifeboats by the Carpathia crew.

Early life 
Zupicich was born in 1893 in Istria Austria-Hungary.

Career 

The Morning Call quoted a 1982 interview of Zupicich with the Shamokin News on the 70th anniversary of the sinking of the Titanic. Zupicich and other stewards were playing cards on the night of April 14, 1912, when Carpathia Captain Arthur Rostron summoned the crew on deck. According to Zupicich in the article, the captain told the crew, "We are in danger. I am risking your lives. The Titanic is in trouble and is sinking and we have to go help them." Zupicich described to the paper how the Carpathia, 50 miles away, picked its way through the icebergs to reach Titanic lifeboats.

His daughter, Marie Zupicich, in 1968 wrote down an eight-page accounting of the five hours that her father and fellow crew members spent rescuing Titanic victims and taking them aboard the Carpathia. She mailed it to newspaper man William C. LeVan, and he published the story, along with a photo of Zupicich.

After 22 trips across the Atlantic as a ship steward, Zupicich worked as a miner in Shamokin, Pennsylvania. He died in 1987 at 94 years old.

References 

1893 births
1987 deaths
American sailors
People from Istria
People from Shamokin, Pennsylvania
RMS Titanic
Austro-Hungarian emigrants to the United States